Jefferson Healthcare is a health system consisting of Jefferson Healthcare Hospital and a number of community clinics in Port Townsend, Washington, USA. 

With over 850 employees, Jefferson Healthcare is the largest employer in Jefferson County. The hospital and clinics employ about 120 physicians and midlevel professionals (nurse practitioners and physician assistants). About half of the revenue comes from Medicare.

References

External links
Jefferson Healthcare homepage

Medical and health organizations based in Washington (state)
Companies based in Port Townsend, Washington